Kent M. Haworth (1946–2003) was a Canadian archivist, best known for his pioneering role in the creation of archival descriptive standards in Canada. He published widely on a number of topics of importance to the development of archival theory, lectured and presented throughout the world, and was a contributing member of many national and international archival committees and associations.

Haworth was editor of the British Columbia Historical News in the late 1970s and early 1980s, published by the British Columbia Historical Federation, along with Patricia Roy and Terry Eastwood.

In 1972 Haworth was hired at the Provincial Archives of British Columbia where he worked in the Manuscripts Division. In 1979 he was appointed as Chief of the PABC's Aural and Visual Records Programme, with responsibility for the management of all non-textual records held by the provincial archives. He worked as the University Archivist at the University of Toronto from 1984-1989, Public Records Archivist at Nova Scotia Archives and Records Management from 1989-1993, and finally served as University Archivist at York University from 1993 to 2002.

Contributions to archival theory 
Perhaps Haworth's most significant contribution to archival practice was his leadership in the creation and establishment of a national standard of archival description, the Rules for Archival Description (RAD). Haworth was part of the Planning Committee on Descriptive Standards established by the Bureau of Canadian Archivists in 1987 and later served as chair from 1989 to 1996. RAD provided a foundation for common archives development across Canada, facilitated the creation of descriptive software for archival institution and created a shared standard of practice across institutions.

In addition to writing the standard, he also advocated the establishment of a national grant program (now defunct), the Canadian Council of Archives' Canadian Archival Information Network (CAIN) to support the creation and maintenance of online descriptive databases managed at the provincial level. His work on the Planning Committee on Descriptive Standards in Canada led to work on international standards bodies such as the International Congress of Archives' Committee on Descriptive Standards (CDS) in 1996. He later served as Project Director and Secretary of this body, and worked to revise ISSAR (CPF).

List of publications

References

External links 

 Obituary in Archivaria by Reuben Ware
 ACA Membership Award Citation, 2002 by Marion Beyea
 Kent Haworth Archival Research Fellowship

1944 births
2003 deaths
Canadian archivists
University of British Columbia alumni
Presidents of the Association of Canadian Archivists